Zleteče (in older sources also Sletiče) is a former settlement in the Municipality of Sevnica in central Slovenia. It is now part of the village of Ledina. The area is part of the traditional region of Styria. The municipality is now included in the Lower Sava Statistical Region.

Geography

Name
Zleteče was attested in historical sources as Slettez in 1364 and Sletecz in 1436.

History
Zleteče was deemed annexed by Ledina in 1955, ending any existence it had as an independent settlement.

References

External links
Zleteče on Geopedia

Populated places in the Municipality of Sevnica
Former settlements in Slovenia